Sion railway station could refer to:

 Sion railway station (India) in Sion, Mumbai, India
 Sion railway station (Switzerland) in Sion, Valais, Switzerland

See also
 Sion (disambiguation)
 Sion Mills railway station, Northern Ireland